The 1987 1000 km di Monza was the third round of the 1987 World Sports-Prototype Championship.  It took place at the Autodromo Nazionale Monza, Italy on April 12, 1987.

Official results
Class winners in bold.  Cars failing to complete 75% of the winner's distance marked as Not Classified (NC).

Statistics
 Pole Position - #17 Rothmans Porsche - 1:32.170
 Fastest Lap - #5 Silk Cut Jaguar - 1:37.160
 Average Speed - 198.090 km/h

References

 

Monza
Monza
6 Hours of Monza